She Oaks is a rural locality in  Victoria, Australia.

The official name is two words, but on VicRoads signs it appears as "Sheoaks".

She Oaks Post Office opened on 23 March 1916 and closed in 1953.

She Oaks had a school and Presbyterian church. The church was moved to Lethbridge after the Uniting Church was formed. In the next year, the school was destroyed by a bush fire.

References

Towns in Victoria (Australia)
Golden Plains Shire